The 1963 Middle Tennessee Blue Raiders football team represented the Middle Tennessee State College—now known as Middle Tennessee State University—as a member of the Ohio Valley Conference (OVC) during the 1963 NCAA College Division football season. Led by 17th-year head coach Charles M. Murphy, the Blue Raiders compiled a record an overall record of 8–2 with a mark of 6–1 in conference play, placing second in the OVC. The team's captains were Jackie Pope and Calvin Shorts.

Schedule

References

Middle Tennessee
Middle Tennessee Blue Raiders football seasons
Middle Tennessee Blue Raiders football